Marialba José Zambrano Saracual (born 17 June 1995) is a Venezuelan footballer who plays as a defensive midfielder for the Venezuela women's national team. She is also a futsal player who has appeared in the 2017 Copa América Femenina de Futsal.

International career
Zambrano represented Venezuela at the 2010 FIFA U-17 Women's World Cup, 2012 South American U-17 Women's Championship and the 2014 South American U-20 Women's Championship. At senior level, she played two Copa América Femenina editions (2014 and 2018) and the 2018 Central American and Caribbean Games.

International goals
Scores and results list Venezuela's goal tally first

References

External links

1995 births
Living people
Women's association football midfielders
Venezuelan women's footballers
People from La Guaira
Venezuela women's international footballers
Central American and Caribbean Games bronze medalists for Venezuela
Competitors at the 2018 Central American and Caribbean Games
Caracas F.C. (women) players
Monagas S.C. players
Cortuluá footballers
Club Sol de América footballers
Venezuelan expatriate women's footballers
Venezuelan expatriate sportspeople in Mexico
Expatriate footballers in Mexico
Venezuelan expatriate sportspeople in Colombia
Expatriate women's footballers in Colombia
Venezuelan expatriate sportspeople in Paraguay
Expatriate women's footballers in Paraguay
Venezuelan women's futsal players
Central American and Caribbean Games medalists in football